Terry Le Main (born November 1939) is a former Jersey politician.

Biography

Terence John Le Main was born in November 1939 in Jersey. He was educated at Hautlieu Grammar School.

Electoral history

He was first elected to the States of Jersey as Deputy of Saint Helier No. 2 in 1978 (re-elected 1984). He was elected as Senator in 1994 and re-elected in 1990. In the 1996 Senatorial election he was ousted in 7th place with 9,578 votes. He then successfully stood for election is his former Deputorial seat in St Helier No. 2 in 1996, topping the poll with 669 votes, and topped the poll again in 1999 (782  votes) and was re-elected in 2002. He stood again as Senator in 2005 and was returned to the Senatorial benches in 4th place with 12,159 votes.

Le Main elected not to stand as Senator in the 2011 Election but again contested the St Helier No. 2 District seeking election as a Deputy. He polled 593 votes, 101 behind Geoff Southern, and failed to gain election.

Ministerial responsibility

Senator Le Main was the Minister for Housing of Jersey from 2005. The Housing department is responsible for general housing policies, liaising with the housing trusts and administering private and public rent subsidies. He resigned in 2010 over allegations of his relationship with a property developer, Frank Venton.  He denied the allegations, and was subsequently cleared, in 2012, by the States of Jersey police due to lack of evidence.

He is also Deputy Chairman of the Overseas Aid Committee.

Political issues

Leylandii hedges

Senator Le Main first raised the issue of deliberately planting high hedges in 1999. As of July 2007, this had still to be resolved but a proposition was due for debate in the States.

Social Housing
In 2003 Senator Le Main called for a review of Social Housing  The issue was still being debated in July 2007 at the final sitting of the States before summer recess.

Reform Jersey
Since his ousting by Southern at the 2011 Jersey general election, le Main has repeated allegations made in 2005 relating to former Jersey Democratic Alliance leader Geoff Southern (now a member of the Reform Jersey political party). These include various allegations of inappropriate behavior when Southern was teaching at Hautlieu School (referring to him as "Creepy Southern), as well as various other allegations of drunken behavior at various events.
le Main has also referred to Southern as a "creepy spiv".

Terry le Main has also criticised and been criticised by Reform Jersey as a whole. In October 2013, le Main was reported as having referred to Reform Jersey as a "recruiting campaign for lunatic lefties for next year's elections", criticism which Reform Jersey described as a "badge of honour".
His criticism of Reform Jersey was most prominent at the 2018 Jersey general election, during le Main posted regularly about Reform Jersey on Facebook - describing the party as "the gamble the Jersey electorate cannot afford to take", "100% Left wing Socialists" (saying that there was "no place for such views etc in a place like JERSEY") and calling Reform Jersey candidates "clueless, useless".
Lots more of this can be found at https://www.facebook.com/search/top/?q=Terry%20Le%20Main%20reform%20jersey.

Criticism

JDA
On the basis of comments made regarding the leader of the JDA at the 2005 elections Geoff Southern, Terry Le Main does not enjoy good relations with the Left wing in Jersey.

References

Government ministers of Jersey
Living people
1939 births
Jersey Roman Catholics
Senators of Jersey
People educated at Hautlieu School
Deputies of Jersey